Thomas Somerville Lindsay (1854–1933) was an Irish Anglican priest and author.

Linney was educated at Trinity College, Dublin and ordained in 1879.  After curacies in Enniscorthy and Bray he was Rector of Malahide with Portmarnock and St. Doulagh's Church, Fingal from 1899 and Archdeacon of Dublin from 1918, retiring from both posts in 1926. He died on 6 September 1933.

References

1854 births
1933 deaths
Alumni of Trinity College Dublin
Archdeacons of Dublin